John Frank Nemechek (March 12, 1970 – March 21, 1997) was an American racing driver who most notably competed in the NASCAR Craftsman Truck Series.

Life and racing career

The younger brother of four-time NASCAR Cup Series race winner Joe Nemechek, John followed his brother into racing, participating in his first race at the age of twelve in an 80 class dirtbike race. After a quick progression to the 250cc class, he moved onto mini-stock cars, where he raced against his brother, and eventually late-model stocks.

When he was not racing, Nemechek served as the front-tire changer on Joe's pit crew, and was on Joe's 1992 NASCAR Busch Series championship-winning team. He would begin attempting NASCAR races himself, and ran one Busch race at IRP in 1994. He finished 30th after his No. 89 Chevrolet suffered an engine failure. The following season, he began racing in the new Craftsman Truck Series, driving at first for Redding Motorsports, and then for his brother's NEMCO Motorsports. In the first year of competition, Nemechek ran 16 races and had two top-ten finishes. He followed that up with two more top-tens in 1996 and a thirteenth-place finish in points, running a single truck he built himself titled the War Wagon under his own team, Chek Racing.

Death
On March 16, 1997, Nemechek was running a Truck Series race at Homestead-Miami Speedway when with 14 laps to go, he lost control and struck the first-turn wall, driver's side first, and hit his head on the wall, suffering head injuries. He was extracted and transported to hospital, where he died on March 21, 1997. At the time of his death, a company had agreed to fully sponsor his truck team beginning at the next race. It was meant to be a surprise for him at the end of the race.

Legacy
Following the incident, Homestead was reconfigured into a true oval with a six-degree banking to reduce the possibility of the type of crash that killed Nemechek.  His brother Joe was able to pay tribute to his brother by winning a Busch Series race that November at the now-reconfigured circuit; he later named his son John Hunter after his late brother.

In 1999, when Joe won his first Cup Race at New Hampshire, he paid tribute to John over the radio while he took the checkered flag:

“This is for my brother John. I love you.”

Motorsports career results

NASCAR
(key) (Bold – Pole position awarded by qualifying time. Italics – Pole position earned by points standings or practice time. * – Most laps led.)

Busch Series

Craftsman Truck Series

References

External links 

 

1970 births
1997 deaths
Sportspeople from Lakeland, Florida
Racing drivers from Florida
NASCAR drivers
Sports deaths in Florida
Racing drivers who died while racing
Filmed deaths in motorsport
American people of Czech descent
Florida Southern College alumni